Erich Lehmann (September 12, 1890 – July 9, 1917) was a German track and field athlete who competed in the 1912 Summer Olympics.

In 1912 he was eliminated in the first round of the 400 metres competition as well as of the 800 metres event. He was also a member of the German relay team which was eliminated in the first round of the 4x400 metre relay competition. He was killed in action during World War I.

See also
 List of Olympians killed in World War I

References

External links
list of German athletes

1890 births
1917 deaths
German male sprinters
German male middle-distance runners
Olympic athletes of Germany
Athletes (track and field) at the 1912 Summer Olympics
German military personnel killed in World War I